Dénis Lindbohm (11 July 1927 – 24 October 2005) was a Swedish author and occultist and is considered one of the founders of Swedish science fiction. In his early years, he worked as a photographic technician in Malmö and became involved in the nascent Swedish science fiction fandom. In the mid-1960s he became a full-time writer.

Bibliography

Draksådd ("Dragon Seed") (mimeographed issue, 1965)
Mörker över Malmö ("Darkness over Malmö") (1969)
Mörkrets fåra ("Furrow of Darkness") (1970)
Jagets eld ("Fire of the Ego") (1971)
Soldat från jorden ("Soldier from Earth") (1973; based on an earlier draft previously published as a serial in the Swedish science fiction fanzine SF-Forum)
Stjärnpesten ("The Star Plague") (1975)
Eden utan Adam ("Eden without Adam") (1975)
Flygande gift ("Flying Poison") (1975)
Stjärnvargen ("The Star Wolf") (1978)
Domens stjärnor ("The Stars of Doom") (1978; full text version at Projekt Runeberg)
Den gyllene randen ("The Golden Edge") (1979)
Regression (1979)
Nattens lösen ("Password for the Night") (1979)
Bevingaren ("The Bewinger") (1980)
Frostens barn ("Children of the Frost") (1980)
Solens vargar ("Wolves of the Sun") (1980)
A-ett ("A-One") (1980)
Eko över bron ("Echo over the Bridge") (1982)
Edens nyckel ("Eden's Key") (1982)
Domens rötter ("The Roots of Doom") (1983)
Eldens barn ("Children of the Fire") (1983)
Nattsidan ("The Nightside") (1983)
Gaias gudbarn ("Gaia's Godchildren") (1983)
Spegelspelet ("The Mirror Game") (1984)
Allt har sin tid ("Everything has its Time") (1984)
Vägens förra slut ("The Former End of the Road") (1984)
Glömda gudars väg ("The Way of Forgotten Gods") (1985)
Vatten över huvud taget ("Water above Head Taken") (1985)
Blå tornet ("The Blue Tower") (1985)
Siaren som sover ("The Seer that Sleeps") (1985)
Vägen bortom Lövestad ("The Road beyond Lövestad") (1986)
Domedagens skymning ("Doomsday's Twilight") (1986)
Evig exil ("Eternal Exile") (1986)
Droppar av dis och eld ("Droplets of Mist and Fire")(1987)
Världförvist (1987)
Trollmakt ("Enchanting Power") (1987)
Dockan från Fomalhaut ("The Doll from Fomalhaut") (1987)
Pentagram, Maktens portal ("Pentagram, the Portal of Power") (1988)
Det kom en orm till Eden ("A Snake came to Eden") (1988)
Skuggor över Elysion ("Shadows over Elysion") (1989)
Spegelns tredje sida ("The Third Face of the Mirror") (1989)
Blod på solen ("Blood on the Sun") (1990)
Den magiska gåvan ("The Magical Gift") (1990)
Där blott andar vandrar ("Where only Spirits Wander") (1991)
Stjärnbollen ("The Star Ball") (1991)
Ljuset är själens färg ("The Light is the Colour of the Soul") (1992)
Den trolska världen ("The Enchanting World") (1992)
Magins system ("The System of Magic") (1993)
Vägen som mörkret belyste ("The Road that Darkness Shone upon") (1993)
Fången är den fries dröm ("Imprisoned is the Dream of the Free") (1994)
Bortom barriären ("Beyond the Barrier") (1994)
Gudarnas lekskola ("Playschool of the Gods") (1995)
Pentagram – Maktens portal (2nd edition) (1995)
Vi som är svärmen ("We who are the Swarm") (1996)
Möten med makterna ("Encounters with the Powers") (1996)
Magins program ("The Program of Magic") (1997)
Legenden av stoft och stjärnor ("The Legend of Dust and Stars") (1997)
Magi ("Magic") (1998)
Genom det inres port ("Through the Gateway of the Inner") (1998)
Drömmens dimension ("The Dimension of the Dream") (1998)
Makten som skapar och förgör ("The Power that Creates and Annihilates") (1999)
De ofödda ("The Unborn") (1999)
Bevingaren (New edition) (2000)
Vid stjärnhjulets rand ("At the Edge of the Star Wheel") (2000)
Vägen genom pentagram ("The Way through Pentagram") (2001)
Magins problem ("The Problem of Magic") (2002)
Makten som botar ("The Power that Cures") (2002)
Vi möttes i Babylon ("We met in Babylon") (2003)
Väktarna vid världens rand ("The Guardians at the Edge of the World")(2003)
Pentagrams andra sida ("The other Side of Pentagram") (2004)
Den inre väktaren ("The inner Guardian") (2004)
Världar runt hörnet ("Worlds around the Corner") (2005)
Kvatur-Glon (2005)

External links
 Svensk fandom del två: Mest om Dénis - artikel av John-Henri Holmberg.
Spegelns tredje sida - hela boken i pdf-format, länken är nu uppdaterad till dess ursprung. (länken fungerar inte numera 10:de December 2010)
Fler titlar på nätet denna sida.

Swedish male writers
Swedish science fiction writers
1927 births
2005 deaths